Calligonum is a genus of plants in the family Polygonaceae with about 80 species across the Mediterranean Sea region, Asia and North America.

Description 
Plants of the genus Calligonum are shrubs, diffusely but irregularly branched, with flexuous woody branches. Leaves are simple, opposite, nearly sessile, linear or scale-like, sometimes absent or very small, linear or filiform, distinct or united with short membranous ochreae. Flowers are bisexual, solitary or in loose axillary inflorescences. Flowers have persistent, 5-parted perianths  not accrescent in fruit, and 10-18 stamens with filaments connate at the base. The ovary is tetragonous.

Taxonomy
The genus Calligonum was first published by Carl Linnaeus in 1753. It is placed in the subfamily Polygonoideae, tribe Calligoneae, along with its sister genus, Pteropyrum.

Species

Calligonum acanthopterum I.G.Borshch.
Calligonum alatosetosum Maassoumi & Kazempour
Calligonum aphyllum (Pall.) Gürke
Calligonum arborescens Litv.
Calligonum azel Maire
Calligonum babakianum Godw.
Calligonum bakuense Litv.
Calligonum bucocladum Bunge
Calligonum bykovii Godw.
Calligonum calvescens Maire
Calligonum caput-medusae Schrenk
Calligonum crinitum Boiss.
Calligonum crispum Bunge
Calligonum cristatum Bunge
Calligonum ebinuricum N.A.Ivanova ex Soskov
Calligonum eriopodum Bunge
Calligonum junceum (Fisch. & C.A.Mey.) Litv.
Calligonum klementzii Losinsk.
Calligonum laristanicum Rech.f. & Schiman-Czeika
Calligonum leucocladum (Schrenk) Bunge
Calligonum litwinowii Drobow
Calligonum macrocarpum I.G.Borshch.
Calligonum matteianum Drobow
Calligonum mejidum Al-Khayat
Calligonum microcarpum I.G.Borshch.
Calligonum mongolicum Turcz.
Calligonum murex Bunge
Calligonum polygonoides L.
Calligonum rubicundum Bunge
Calligonum santoanum Korovin
Calligonum schizopterum Rech.f. & Schiman-Czeika
Calligonum setosum (Litv.) Litv.
Calligonum spinosetosum Maassoumi & Batooli
Calligonum taklimakanense B.R.Pan & K.M.Shen
Calligonum tetrapterum Jaub. & Spach
Calligonum trifarium Z.M.Mao
Calligonum triste Litv.
Calligonum turbineum Pavlov

References

 
Polygonaceae genera
Taxa named by Carl Linnaeus